Eyvin Seward Schiøttz (28 April 1910 in Copenhagen – 10 April 1978 in Copenhagen) was a sailor from Denmark, who was one of the reserve team members for the Danish 6 Metre at the 1948 Summer Olympics at Torbay, Great Britain. 

Since the beginning of the activities of the International Soling Association Eyvin played an important role for the Soling class. The annual Soling Guides from 1970 until the 1977 edition was mainly his work. From 1967 till his death, after a long illness, in 1978 Eyvin was secretary and treasurer of the International Soling Association. 

Eyvin was author of many books. Some of them are listed below:
 Practical yacht racing : a hand book on the 1959 racing rules, racing technique and tactics
 Jeg er sejler
 1913-1963 : Sejlernes håndbog
 International Yacht Racing Union's kapsejladsregler : 1. jan. 1961 med kommentarer : tillæg til "Kapsejlads" og "Den lille kapsejlads"
 Kongelig Dansk Yachtklub
 Danske både : Dansk Sejlunions fartøjsfortegnelse 1962

Eyvin was the father of Nina Schiøttz

Reference 

  
  
  
  

1910 births
1979 deaths
Sportspeople from Copenhagen
Danish male sailors (sport)
Sailors at the 1948 Summer Olympics – 6 Metre
Olympic sailors of Denmark